Nelson Filipe dos Santos Simões Oliveira (born 6 March 1989) is a Portuguese professional road racing cyclist who currently rides for UCI WorldTeam .

Career
In September 2009, Anadia-born Oliveira won the silver medal in the under-23 time trial at the UCI Road World Championships.

In September 2010, he went again to the UCI Road World Championships, and was 4th in the under-23 time trial, not repeating a podium by just 4 seconds. In 2011 he won the Portuguese National Time Trial Championships and finished 17th in the UCI World Time Trial Championships.  At the 2012 Summer Olympics, he competed in the men's road race and the men's individual time trial.

Oliveira left  at the end of the 2013 season, and joined  for the 2014 season. In 2014, he won the Portuguese National Time Trial Championships again. He also won the Portuguese National Road Race Championships several days later. In September 2015 it was reported that Oliveira would leave  and join  for 2016. At the 2016 Summer Olympics, he competed in the road race and the men's individual time trial.

Major results

Source: 

2006
 1st  Time trial, National Junior Road Championships
2007
 1st Stage 3a Vuelta Valladolid Juniors
 7th Time trial, UEC European Junior Road Championships
2008
 3rd Overall Volta a Madeira
2009
 1st  Time trial, National Under-23 Road Championships
 2nd  Time trial, UCI Under-23 Road World Championships
 5th Overall Volta a Madeira
1st Stage 6
2010
 1st  Time trial, National Under-23 Road Championships
 UEC European Under-23 Road Championships
2nd  Road race
3rd  Time trial
 2nd Overall Grand Prix du Portugal
 4th Time trial, UCI Under-23 Road World Championships
 6th Overall Bayern–Rundfahrt
 6th Overall Giro delle Regioni
2011
 1st  Time trial, National Road Championships
2012
 1st  Mountains classification, Ster ZLM Toer
 3rd Overall Circuit de la Sarthe
2014
 National Road Championships
1st  Time trial
1st  Road race
 7th Time trial, UCI Road World Championships
2015
 1st  Time trial, National Road Championships
 1st Stage 13 Vuelta a España
 5th Chrono des Nations
2016
 National Road Championships
1st  Time trial
2nd Road race
 3rd Overall Tour du Poitou-Charentes
 4th Time trial, UEC European Road Championships
 7th Time trial, Olympic Games
2017
 4th Time trial, UCI Road World Championships
 Hammer Sportzone Limburg 
5th Overall
1st Stage 1
2018
 5th Time trial, UCI Road World Championships
 10th Overall Volta ao Algarve
2019
 European Games
2nd  Time trial
10th Road race
 6th Overall Vuelta a Castilla y León
 6th Trofeo Serra de Tramuntana
 8th Time trial, UCI Road World Championships
2020
 6th Overall Vuelta a San Juan
2021
 2nd Overall Volta a la Comunitat Valenciana
 4th Time trial, National Road Championships
 9th Overall Vuelta a Asturias
2022
 8th Time trial, UCI Road World Championships

Grand Tour general classification results timeline

Major championships results timeline

References

External links

 
 
 
 

1989 births
Living people
People from Anadia, Portugal
Portuguese male cyclists
Portuguese track cyclists
Portuguese Vuelta a España stage winners
Cyclists at the 2012 Summer Olympics
Cyclists at the 2016 Summer Olympics
Cyclists at the 2020 Summer Olympics
Olympic cyclists of Portugal
Cyclists at the 2019 European Games
European Games medalists in cycling
European Games silver medalists for Portugal
Sportspeople from Aveiro District
21st-century Portuguese people